Career Day often refers to a day in school where students learn about different careers and locations, and may specifically refer to:
 Career Day (Modern Family), an episode of the television series Modern Family
 Career Day (That '70s Show), an episode of the television series That '70s Show
 Career Day (Invader Zim), an episode of the television series Invader Zim
 "Career Day", a song from the album Interventions + Lullabies by The Format